Sunset (formerly Sun Set) is an unincorporated community in Reed Township, Washington County, Arkansas, United States. It is located at the intersection of Sunset Road (Washington County Road 38 [CR 38]) and CR 110.

History
A post office was established at Summers in 1888, and remained in operation until 1951.

References

Unincorporated communities in Washington County, Arkansas
Unincorporated communities in Arkansas